John Geraghty (born 20 June 1942) is an Irish former Gaelic footballer who played at club level with Kilkerrin, Mountbellew–Moylough and Fr Griffin's and at inter-county level with the Galway senior football team. He usually lined out as a goalkeeper.

Playing career

Geraghty first came to Gaelic football prominence during his student days. He won a Hogan Cup title with St Jarlath's College in 1960 before later winning a Sigerson Cup title with University College Galway. At club level he won consecutive Galway SFC titles with the Mountbellew–Moylough club. Geraghty first appeared on the inter-county scene as a member of the Galway minor football team in 1960. He won a Connacht Minor Championship title in 1960 but missed the All-Ireland final win over Cork. Geraghty was promoted to the Galway senior team for a tournament game against Meath in November 1963. He quickly became the first-choice goalkeeper and won three consecutive All-Ireland Championship titles from 1964 to 1966. Geraghty's other inter-county honours include Conancht Championship medals and a National League title.  He also won a Railway Cup medal with Connacht. Geraghty was a three-time Cúchulainn Award-winner and was later named on the Galway Football Team of the Millennium.

Coaching career

Geraghty had two stints in team management after his playing days ended, leading the Galway minor football team to the All-Ireland Championship title in 1976 and later coaching the Connacht Railway Cup team. He was also approached to take over as Galway senior team manager.

Personal life

Geraghty's career as an Irish and Latin teacher took him through the vocational schools in Edenderry and Glenamaddy before taking a position in Coláiste Iognáid in Galway. He later qualified as a physical education teacher. Geraghty was forced out of teaching in 1993, having suffered from arthritis in both hips, which necessitated replacements. He subsequently studied law, qualifying in 1999.

Honours

Player

St Jarlath's College
All-Ireland Colleges Senior Football Championship: 1960
Connacht Colleges Senior Football Championship: 1960

University College Galway
Sigerson Cup: 1964

Mountbellew–Moylough
Galway Senior Football Championship: 1964, 1965

Galway
All-Ireland Senior Football Championship: 1964, 1965, 1966
Connacht Senior Football Championship: 1964, 1965, 1966, 1968
National Football League: 1964-65
Connacht Minor Football Championship: 1960

Connacht
Railway Cup: 1967

Coach

Galway
All-Ireland Minor Football Championship: 1976
Connacht Minor Football Championship: 1976

References

1942 births
Living people
Mountbellew–Moylough Gaelic footballers
Kilkerrin-Clonberne Gaelic footballers
Fr. Griffin's Gaelic footballers
Galway inter-county Gaelic footballers
Connacht inter-provincial Gaelic footballers
Gaelic football goalkeepers
Gaelic football coaches
Irish schoolteachers
Language teachers